Doylesburg is an unincorporated community in Franklin County, in the U.S. state of Pennsylvania.

History
Doylesburg was platted in 1851 by  Philip T. Doyle, and named for him. A post office was established at Doylesburg in 1854.

References

Unincorporated communities in Franklin County, Pennsylvania
Unincorporated communities in Pennsylvania